Bonab Rural District is in the Central District of Zanjan County, Zanjan province, Iran. At the National Census of 2006, its population was 11,782 in 2,846 households. There were 13,665 inhabitants in 3,847 households at the following census of 2011. At the most recent census of 2016, the population of the rural district was 14,146 in 4,299 households. The largest of its 45 villages was Dizajabad, with 4,157 people.

References 

Zanjan County

Rural Districts of Zanjan Province

Populated places in Zanjan Province

Populated places in Zanjan County